Shlomo Pinto was an Israeli paralympic champion.

Pinto was a soldier with the IDF's Golani Brigade during the Yom Kippur War. Injured during the battle at Mount Hermon, his legs were paralyzed and Pinto began practicing sports with the IDF Disabled Veterans' Organization.

Pinto practiced badminton, wheelchair basketball and swimming, representing Israel in the latter field in all Paralympic Games between 1976 and 1992 and winning 14 medals.

Pinto died 18 June 2011 at the age of 57, several weeks after suffering a brain seizure.

References

External links
 

2011 deaths
Israeli male swimmers
Paralympic swimmers of Israel
Swimmers at the 1976 Summer Paralympics
Swimmers at the 1980 Summer Paralympics
Swimmers at the 1984 Summer Paralympics
Swimmers at the 1988 Summer Paralympics
Swimmers at the 1992 Summer Paralympics
Paralympic gold medalists for Israel
Paralympic silver medalists for Israel
Paralympic bronze medalists for Israel
Year of birth missing
Medalists at the 1976 Summer Paralympics
Medalists at the 1980 Summer Paralympics
Medalists at the 1984 Summer Paralympics
Medalists at the 1988 Summer Paralympics
Paralympic medalists in swimming